Spyridon Mavrogiorgos (born 1915) was a Greek swimmer. He competed in two events at the 1936 Summer Olympics.

References

External links
 

1915 births
Year of death missing
Greek male swimmers
Olympic swimmers of Greece
Swimmers at the 1936 Summer Olympics
Place of birth missing